The Rural Municipality of Spalding No. 368 is a rural municipality (RM) in the Canadian province of Saskatchewan within Census Division No. 14 and  Division No. 4.

History 
The RM of Spalding No. 368 incorporated as a rural municipality on December 11, 1911.

Heritage properties
St. Michael's Anglican Church (dedicated on May 17, 1909) and its associated cemetery is located 20 kilometres southeast of Daphne within the RM. The church was in active service until 1943.

Demographics 

Economy 
The economy of the RM is predominantly agricultural.

Government 
The RM of Spalding No. 368 is governed by an elected municipal council and an appointed administrator that meets on the first Wednesday of every month. The reeve of the RM is Eugene Eggerman while its administrator is Cathy Holt. The RM's office is located in Spalding.

References 

Spalding
Spalding No. 368, Saskatchewan